Polyplatano (before 1926: Κλαμπουσίστα - Klampousista) is a village in Florina Regional Unit, Macedonia, Greece.

The Greek census (1920) recorded 628 people in the village and in 1923 there were 45 inhabitants (or 11 families) who were Muslim. Following the Greek-Turkish population exchange, in 1926 within Klampousista there were 29 refugee families from Pontus. The Greek census (1928) recorded 742 village inhabitants. In 1928, there were 29 refugee families (128 people). 

Polyplatano had 428 inhabitants in 1981. In fieldwork done by Riki Van Boeschoten in late 1993, Polyplatano was populated by Slavophones and a Greek population descended from Anatolian Greek refugees who arrived during the population exchange. The Macedonian language was used by people of all ages, both in public and private settings, and as the main language for interpersonal relationships. Some elderly villagers had little knowledge of Greek. Pontic Greek was spoken by people over 60, mainly in private.

References 

Populated places in Florina (regional unit)